iAmaze is an Internet company that specializes in web applications created in dynamic HTML. Applications created by the company are designed to run on all browsers and operating systems, without downloads or plug-ins.

AOL purchased the company on September 5, 2000, and commented that "iAmaze will help further strengthen its services by providing Web-based applications from this platform with the speed and functionality of traditional client-side desktop applications."

References

Development software companies